These are the official results of the Men's 3,000 metres steeplechase event at the 1986 European Championships in Stuttgart, West Germany, held at Neckarstadion on 27 and 29 August 1986.

Medalists

Final

Qualifying heats

Participation
According to an unofficial count, 24 athletes from 16 countries participated in the event.

 (1)
 (1)
 (1)
 (1)
 (3)
 (1)
 (1)
 (2)
 (2)
 (2)
 (1)
 (1)
 (2)
 (1)
 (2)
 (2)

See also
 1982 Men's European Championships 3,000m Steeplechase (Athens)
 1983 Men's World Championships 3,000m Steeplechase (Helsinki)
 1984 Men's Olympic 3,000m Steeplechase (Los Angeles)
 1987 Men's World Championships 3,000m Steeplechase (Rome)
 1988 Men's Olympic 3,000m Steeplechase (Seoul)
 1990 Men's European Championships 3,000m Steeplechase (Split)

References

External links
 Results

Steeplechase 3000
Steeplechase at the European Athletics Championships